Hyalohyphomycosis is a group of opportunistic mycotic infections caused by nondematiaceous molds, and may be contrasted with phaeohyphomycosis.A hyalohyphomycetes example is Fusarium.

See also 
 Acremonium
 List of cutaneous conditions

References 

Animal fungal diseases
Mycosis-related cutaneous conditions